The Bureau of the European Parliament is responsible for matters relating to the budget, administration, organisation and staff. It is composed of the President of the European Parliament along with all 14 Vice-Presidents and the five Quaestors (in a consultative capacity). They are elected for two and a half years (renewable term) with the President holding a casting vote. Elections are usually held at the start, and at the midpoint, of each Parliamentary term.

Members

2022-

2019-2022

2009-2012

Resigned
Pál Schmitt, Vice President, EPP, Hungary - became President of the Republic of Hungary on 6 August 2010
replaced by Tőkés (Romania)
Silvana Koch-Mehrin, Vice President, ALDE, Germany - resigned over doctoral thesis plagiarism affair on 11 May 2011
replaced by Chichester (South West England)
Stavros Lambrinidis, Vice President, S & D, Greece - became Minister for Foreign Affairs of Greece on 17 June 2011
replaced by Podimata (Greece)

2007-2009
 Hans-Gert Pöttering: President
 Rodi Kratsa-Tsagaropoulou: Vice-President
 Alejo Vidal-Quadras Roca: Vice-President
 Gérard Onesta: Vice-President
 Edward McMillan-Scott: Vice-President
 Mario Mauro: Vice-President
 Miguel Angel Martínez Martínez: Vice-President
 Luigi Cocilovo: Vice-President
 Mechtild Rothe: Vice-President
 Luisa Morgantini: Vice-President
 Pierre Moscovici: Vice-President
 Manuel António dos Santos: Vice-President
 Diana Wallis: Vice-President	
 Marek Siwiec: Vice-President	
 Adam Bielan: Vice-President	
 James Nicholson: Quaestor
 Astrid Lulling: Quaestor
 Mia De Vits: Quaestor
 Ingo Friedrich: Quaestor
 Szabolcs Fazakas: Quaestor
 Jan Mulder: Quaestor

Rules of procedure of the European Parliament

External links
 Bureau europarl.europa.eu
 Rules of Procedure europarl.europa.eu

European Parliament
Presiding bodies of legislatures

it:Presidente del Parlamento europeo#Ufficio di presidenza